Adams Central High School in Monroe, Adams County, Indiana, United States, is a public high school of the Adams Central Community Schools.  It has been named a "Four Star School" by the Indiana Department of Education three times since 2009.

Athletics
Adams Central is part of the Allen County Athletic Conference.  They compete under the name "Flying Jets" and the school colors are red and white.  The following sports are offered at Central (unless marked, there are separate boys' and girls' teams):

 Baseball (boys')
 Basketball
 Cross country
 Football (boys')
 State champions - 2000
 Golf
 Softball (girls')
 Swimming
 Tennis
 Track
 Volleyball (girls')
 Wrestling (boys')

See also
 List of high schools in Indiana
 Allen County Athletic Conference
 Monroe, Adams County, Indiana

References

External links
 Official website

Public high schools in Indiana
Schools in Adams County, Indiana